Jakun may refer to:
Yakun, an 11th-century Viking warrior in Russia.
Jakun people
Jakun language